IAPM Mall, or iAPM Mall, is a shopping mall located at 999 Huaihai Road in Xuhui District, Shanghai, China.

This upscale mall houses big-name boutiques on the first two floors, including Prada, Gucci, Miu Miu and Dolce & Gabbana, Stella McCartney, Alexander McQueen, Alexander Wang, Chloé, Maje, Balmain and Michael Kors.

Younger brands like Zadig & Voltaire, Marimekko, Fedon and Muji occupy the third floor and the fourth floor is for sports brands like Nike, Aigle, and Onitsuka Tiger.

The mall is complete with restaurants, cafes and cinemas.

Transportation 
The mall is connected by Shanghai Metro Line 1, 10, and 12 (South Shaanxi Road Station).

See also
 List of shopping malls in China

References

External links
 

Shopping malls in Shanghai
Xuhui District